The Barbed Wire Museum can refer to:

 Devils Rope Barbed Wire Museum
 Kansas Barbed Wire Museum